Believe is a 2013 British sports drama film directed by David Scheinmann. Set in Manchester in 1984, it stars Brian Cox as legendary Scottish football manager Sir Matt Busby, who comes out of retirement to coach a team of young working-class boys captained by the talented but unruly Georgie Gallagher (played by Jack Smith). The film also stars Natascha McElhone as Erica Gallagher, Anne Reid as Jean Busby and Toby Stephens as Georgie's prospective headmaster.
Believe was released theatrically in the United Kingdom on 25 July 2014.

Plot 

In 1984 Salford, Georgie Gallagher lives with his widowed mother, Erica (Natascha McElhone). His passion for football is challenged by Erica's desire to have Georgie attend the prestigious, rugby-playing Lancashire Grammar School For Boys, run by the strict and scholarly Dr Farquar (Toby Stephens). Georgie is up for scholarship at the prestigious school pending on his passing of the entrance exam.

Whilst attending an open day at the school, Georgie sees a leaflet for a regional Manchester Junior Football Cup tournament. Determined to enter and beat the team of school bullies, Georgie snatches a wallet from a stranger in the hopes of getting the £20 entrance fee. The stranger happens to be an elderly Sir Matt Busby (Brian Cox), and after tracking him down along with the help of his friend Bob (Philip Jackson), the pair learn that Georgie is an unusually talented footballer. Matt and Georgie reach an agreement whereby Matt will coach Georgie's football team in exchange for silence over his theft.

Still needing the money to enter the football tournament, Georgie attempts to break into Dr Farquar's house in order to steal back the tuition fee that Erica had been paying in order to ensure Georgie's passes his entrance exam to the grammar school. He is caught and arrested, and banned from playing football as punishment.

The team finds an article in the paper about Sir Matt Busby and realize that their coach is the famous manager of the legendary Manchester United team. Feeling betrayed by his team and Sir Matt Busby for not revealing his true identity before, Georgie quits the team and refuses to play in the final. Georgie is deeply hurt, feeling that all adults undoubtedly end up lying to him.

On the day of Sir Matt Busby's 75th birthday, the team gears up to play the final, while Georgie takes his exam with hopes of passing and receiving his scholarship. Georgie urges Erica to attend the final to cheer on the team. Without their leader, the team is down by 2 goals. In a moment of grace, Dr. Farquar interrupts the game with his beloved brass band, while Erica rushes to get Georgie to play the second half of the match. Georgie confides in his mother and says he wants to win the cup in honour of his late father. In the final moments of the game Georgie scores with a direct free kick to win the cup.

Cast
 Jack Smith as Georgie Gallagher
 Brian Cox as Sir Matt Busby
 Natascha McElhone as Erica Gallagher
 Anne Reid as Jean Busby
 Philip Jackson as Bob
 Kate Ashfield as Helen
 James Callis as Man in Mac
 Toby Stephens as Dr. Farquar

Filming
Filming began in September 2011 and took place at various locations around Greater Manchester; many key scenes were shot at the Stockport Cricket Club.

See also
 Bend It Like Beckham
 Early Man (film)

References

External links

2013 films
2010s sports drama films
British sports drama films
British association football films
Films set in the 1980s
Films set in Manchester
2013 drama films
Films shot in Greater Manchester
2010s English-language films
2010s British films